WMCT (1390 AM) is a radio station licensed to serve Mountain City, Tennessee, United States. The station is owned by Johnson County Broadcasting, Inc.

WMCT broadcasts a classic country music format.  The station was assigned the WMCT call sign by the Federal Communications Commission.

References

External links
WMCT official website

Mountain City, Tennessee
MCT
Classic country radio stations in the United States
Music of Johnson County, Tennessee
Radio stations established in 1967
Johnson County, Tennessee